German submarine U-512 was a Type IXC U-boat of Nazi Germany's Kriegsmarine built for service during World War II. Although she was short-lived, U-512 was quite a successful boat, making full use of the time she enjoyed in the entrance to the Caribbean Sea, during the Second Happy Time.

The Deutsche Werft shipyard in Hamburg built her during 1941, she was completed in December, ready for her working-up period in the Baltic Sea to train her crew and iron out any engineering problems. Following this, she was detailed to cross the Atlantic Ocean and operate off the northern coast of South America in order to catch unescorted Allied shipping heading for or leaving the Panama Canal.

Design
German Type IXC submarines were slightly larger than the original Type IXBs. U-512 had a displacement of  when at the surface and  while submerged. She had two shafts and two  propellers.

U-512 was fitted with six  torpedo tubes (four fitted at the bow and two at the stern), 22 torpedoes, one  SK C/32 naval gun, 180 rounds, and a  SK C/30 as well as a  C/30 anti-aircraft gun. The boat had a complement of forty-eight.

Service history

Departing from Kiel on the 15 August 1942, U-512 headed into the Atlantic via the Norwegian coast and the gap between Iceland and the Faeroe Islands and then to the southwest, arriving in her designated patrol zone by the second week in September. She was almost immediately successful, sinking the slow, unescorted 10,865 GRT American tanker Patrick J. Hurley with her deck gun, claiming 17 lives. A week later, a second ship was found, the lone 3,720 GRT Spanish freighter  Monte Gorbea, which was sunk with 52 lives, despite her neutral status. This act would undoubtedly have led to Schultze's court-martial, had he returned from the patrol. U-512s final victory came on the 24 September, when another American ship, the 6,034 GRT Antinous was sunk by two torpedoes off Venezuela.

On the 2 October, while still lurking off the South American coast, U-512 was spotted off Cayenne by a B-18 Bolo aircraft belonging to the 99th Bombardment Group of the United States Army Air Forces. The aircraft flew low and dropped its bomb load directly on the boat, sinking her and 51 of her crew instantly. Only one man, Matrosengefreiter Franz Machon (Polish: Franciszek Machoń) escaped the boat and was rescued from his raft by the   ten days later.

Summary of raiding history

References

Bibliography

External links

World War II shipwrecks in the Atlantic Ocean
German Type IX submarines
World War II submarines of Germany
U-boats sunk by US aircraft
U-boats commissioned in 1941
U-boats sunk by depth charges
1941 ships
U-boats sunk in 1942
Ships built in Hamburg
Maritime incidents in October 1942